Tamer Wa Shaw'eyyah is an Egyptian sitcom acted by Ahmed El-Fishawy and May Kassab.

The screenplay was written by: Amr Samir Atef - Twitter Alasfory - Ayman Ahmed Khalaf

Directed by: Osama Al Abd

References

External links 
  Tamer Wa Shaw'eyyah Part 6  at  Arab cinema database

Egyptian television sitcoms
Egyptian Radio and Television Union original programming